Mountain Strawberries 2 (산딸기 2 - Sanddalgi 2), also known as Wild Strawberries 2, is a 1985 South Korean film directed by Kim Su-hyeong. It was the second entry in the Mountain Strawberries series.

Synopsis
A farmer in a community near Jirisan falls in love with and marries an itinerant performer. She plans to betray him by robbing him and leaving with her old boyfriend, another itinerant performer, when he comes to the village. Eventually she realizes she loves the farmer and stays with him.

Cast
 Seonu Il-ran
 Ma Hung-sik
 You Young-kook
 Yeo Woon-kay
 Yang Hyoung-ho
 Kim Ok-jin
 Park Yong-pal
 Son Jeon
 Oh Do-kyu
 Choe Jae-ho

Bibliography

English

Korean

Notes

1985 films
South Korean erotic films
1980s Korean-language films
South Korean sequel films